The Grand Prix de Oriente (Grand Prix San Miguel) is an elite women's professional one-day road bicycle race held in El Salvador.

Past winners

References 

 
Cycle races in El Salvador